Dr. Vinod K. Agarwal was an Indian-American businessman and scientist. He was a professor at McGill University in Montreal, Quebec, Canada from 1978 to 1992. He then founded LogicVision, which he took public in October, 2001, as the first technology IPO following the terrorist attacks earlier that year. Agarwal left LogicVision in 2005 to start SemIndia, a semiconductor company based in India.

Biography 
Born to Madhuri Sharan Agrawal and Premvati Agrawal in Mathura, India, Agarwal received his undergraduate education at Birla Institute of Technology and Science, followed by an M.S. from the University of Pittsburgh and a Ph.D. from Johns Hopkins University.

Professorship 
Upon completing his Ph.D., Dr. Agarwal joined the faculty of the Computer Science Department at the McGill University in Montreal. He stayed on the faculty for 16 years, eventually retiring as head of the Department of Electrical Engineering

Accolades 
Dr. Agarwal has been recognized for his contributions to the field by being named Silicon India's 2002 Entrepreneur of the year, as well as being profiled in Fortune magazine 
and the Wharton Global Business Forum among other publications and conferences.

References 

Living people
Indian emigrants to the United States
American people of Indian descent
American businesspeople
University of Pittsburgh alumni
Johns Hopkins University alumni
Year of birth missing (living people)